Hyperaxis is a genus of leaf beetles in the subfamily Eumolpinae. It is distributed in East and Southeast Asia.

Species
Species in Hyperaxis include:

 Hyperaxis albostriata (Motschulsky, 1866)
 Hyperaxis ariyani Chûjô, 1964
 Hyperaxis balyi (Jacoby, 1889)
 Hyperaxis buonloica Moseyko & Medvedev, 2017
 Hyperaxis buonloica buonloica Moseyko & Medvedev, 2017
 Hyperaxis buonloica darlaki Moseyko & Medvedev, 2017
 Hyperaxis dentifemur Moseyko & Medvedev, 2017
 Hyperaxis distincta Duvivier, 1892
 Hyperaxis dubia Jacoby, 1908
 Hyperaxis feae Jacoby, 1904
 Hyperaxis foveolata Jacoby, 1908
 Hyperaxis fulvohirsuta (Jacoby, 1904)
 Hyperaxis grisea Jacoby, 1908
 Hyperaxis harmandi Lefèvre, 1893
 Hyperaxis longipilosa Moseyko & Medvedev, 2017
 Hyperaxis maculata Kimoto & Gressitt, 1982
 Hyperaxis malabarica Jacoby, 1908
 Hyperaxis mandarensis Jacoby, 1908
 Hyperaxis nigra (Chen, 1935)
 Hyperaxis nigrescens (Chûjô, 1956)
 Hyperaxis nigrita (Eroshkina, 1992)
 Hyperaxis pallidicornis (Jacoby, 1892)
 Hyperaxis pallidipes (Pic, 1929)
 Hyperaxis penicillata Jacoby, 1908
 Hyperaxis phanrangi Moseyko & Medvedev, 2017
 Hyperaxis phuquocnia Nguyen, 2022
 Hyperaxis quadraticollis Jacoby, 1908
 Hyperaxis scutellata (Baly, 1863)
 Hyperaxis sellata (Baly, 1863)
 Hyperaxis sonlanga Moseyko & Medvedev, 2017
 Hyperaxis tanongchiti Kimoto & Gressitt, 1982
 Hyperaxis variegata Jacoby, 1904
 Hyperaxis yaosanica Chen, 1940

The following species were described for the genus Pseudopiomera, but have not been moved to Hyperaxis (?):
 Pseudopiomera andrewesi Jacoby, 1908
 Pseudopiomera ceylonensis Jacoby, 1908

The following are synonyms of other species:
 Hyperaxis consors Chen, 1940: synonym of Hyperaxis yaosanica Chen, 1940
 Hyperaxis duvivieri (Jacoby, 1904): synonym of Trichotheca hirta Baly, 1860
 Hyperaxis robustus (Pic, 1929): synonym of Demotina inhirsuta (Pic, 1923)
 Hyperaxis semifasciata (Jacoby, 1887): synonym of Hyperaxis albostriata (Motschulsky, 1866)

References

Eumolpinae
Chrysomelidae genera
Beetles of Asia
Taxa named by Edgar von Harold